Chickenfeed was a chain of discount retail stores in Australia, founded in 1990 in Tasmania by the prominent Sypkes family. At its height it had roughly 44 stores in Tasmania, Victoria and New South Wales. It was taken over by Australian Discount Retail Group in 2001, and the brand was discontinued after the parent company went into receivership. It currently has no stores remaining in Australia.

History
The company was founded by Rudie and Peter Sypkes in 1990, and continued to expand until it became Tasmania's only discount retail store chain, and Rudie and Peter Sypkes continued to run Chickenfeed until 2001, when the retail chain was sold to the Australian Discount Retail Group.

In 2009 Australian millionaire Jan Cameron purchased the parent company, Australian Discount Retail and ownership changed to Retail Adventures Pty Ltd. Following the change of ownership, it was announced that all Go-Lo, Crazy Clark's and Sam's Warehouse stores would be rebranded Chickenfeed over the next five years. Soon after it was announced that nine new Chickenfeed stores were to be opened in Victoria to test the mainland market. The last of these was opened in August, and nearly 20 stores were eventually opened across the mainland.

Store closure began in October 2012 with up to 20 Chickenfeed stores in Tasmania closed or closure was announced without explanation, including a Launceston (Prospect Vale) store which was forcibly reclaimed by security guards of the company which owned the complex it was situated in, after the company did not pay its rent, as well as a similar situation in its store in Centrepoint Shopping Centre, Hobart.

On 27 October 2012, parent company Retail Adventures was placed in administration. Owner Jan Cameron continued to operate the profitable stores under a licence from the administrators. The Chickenfeed rebranding has ceased, with the Chickenfeed brand to disappear altogether. Any remaining profitable stores after a restructure were rebranded as "Crazy Clark's" or "Sam's Warehouse".

During the period of administration, concern had been expressed by company staff that one of the primary reasons behind the changes and eventual closure of stores was due to the high rent imposed on the stores by the landlords, the Sypkes family. The Sypkes family hold a 50% share in the Shiploads discount chain, and a number of Shiploads discount stores have opened in locations that previously held Chickenfeed stores.

All stores were closed on May 20, 2013, excluding the Southern Tasmania Clearance Centre which was rebranded to Sam's Warehouse in mid October 2013.

References

Discount stores of Australia
Retail companies established in 1990
Australian companies established in 1990
Defunct retail companies of Australia
Companies based in Tasmania
Retail companies disestablished in 2013
Australian companies disestablished in 2013